is a Japanese rugby union player who plays as a Scrum-half.

References

1993 births
Living people
Rugby union scrum-halves
Sunwolves players
Japanese rugby union players
Toyota Industries Shuttles Aichi players
Coca-Cola Red Sparks players
Tokyo Sungoliath players
21st-century Japanese people